Christ Carrying the Cross is an oil on panel painting by Hieronymus Bosch, executed in the most likely c. 1490-1500. It is at the Kunsthistorisches Museum, in Vienna, Austria.

Christ Child with a Walking Frame is painted on the back of this painting.

See also
Christ Carrying the Cross (Bosch, Ghent)
Christ Carrying the Cross (Bosch, Madrid)

External links
Christ Carrying The Cross 1480s at http://www.hieronymus-bosch.org

1480s paintings
Paintings by Hieronymus Bosch
Bosch
Paintings in the collection of the Kunsthistorisches Museum